This is a list of members of the Tasmanian House of Assembly between the 1886 election and the 1891 election.

Notes
 Significant changes to seats occurred at the 1886 election, with several old seats abolished and a net gain of four seats.
 In February 1887, the Attorney-General and member for one of the two South Hobart seats, John Dodds, resigned. Andrew Inglis Clark won the resulting by-election on 4 March 1887.
 On 15 February 1887, Richard Lucas, one of the two members for Kingborough, was appointed Attorney-General in James Agnew's Ministry. He was therefore required to resign and contest a ministerial by-election in his seat. On 15 March 1887, an Opposition candidate, Henry Gill, defeated Lucas at the by-election. The Agnew ministry subsequently fell and Philip Fysh was invited to form a government, which took office on 29 March 1887.
 Following the Fysh ministry's appointment on 29 March 1887, the new ministers were required to resign and contest ministerial by-elections. All were returned unopposed a week later.
 In May 1887, the member for Glenorchy, Alfred Dobson, resigned. John Hamilton won the resulting by-election on 20 June 1887.
 On 29 October 1888, the member for West Devon and Minister for Lands and Works, Edward Braddon, resigned to take up the role of Agent-General for Tasmania in London. John McCall won the resulting by-election on 12 November 1888. Alfred Pillinger replaced Braddon in the Ministry and was returned unopposed at a ministerial by-election on 6 November 1888.
 On 21 January 1889, the member for Sorell, James Gray, died. Charles Featherstone won the resulting by-election on 11 February 1889.
 On 1 April 1889, the member for Campbell Town, William Brown, resigned. William Bennett won the resulting by-election on 30 April 1889.
 On 18 December 1890, the member for New Norfolk, George Huston, died. George Leatham won the resulting by-election on 13 January 1891.
 On 5 February 1891, one of the two members for East Devon, James Dooley, died. Henry Murray won the resulting by-election held later in the month.

Sources
 
 Parliament of Tasmania (2006). The Parliament of Tasmania from 1856

Members of Tasmanian parliaments by term
19th-century Australian politicians